Shronell, Shrone Hill, or Shronel is a civil parish and townland near the villages of Lattin and Emly in County Tipperary, Ireland. It is situated 3 miles southwest of Tipperary town on the R515 regional road.

Name 

The word "Shronell" is an English version of the Irish language placename "Srónaill" (Srón=nose / aill=cliff), therefore Shronell means "nose shaped cliff". It is called this probably due to a steep hill ledge north of the cemetery. Shronell is historically divided into Shronellbeg (from the Irish beag, meaning small) and Shronellmór (mór, meaning big). These divisions can be seen on ordnance survey maps.

History 
Joseph Damer, (1630–1720), an officer in Oliver Cromwell's New Model Army was granted lands in Shronell in 1662. 
There were concerted efforts made by the Damer family to introduce Protestant workers from the northern counties, and by 1766 there were eighty-two Protestant families in Shronell.
In 1837, the parish, (sometimes spelled Shronehill) in the barony of Clanwilliam, contained a total of 1006 inhabitants and encompassed the townlands of Ballinglanna, Ballycohy, Ballyconry, Barronstown (Ormond), Shronell Beg and Shronell More. It consisted of 2,747 statute acres (1,113 hectares), some of which was cultivated but mostly in pasture. 'Ballinard' was the residence of W. Chadwick.. Other notable residents were Clement Sadler, 'Damerville', Austin Cooper 'Chadwickand' and Rev. M. Clarkethe of the glebe house. The Protestant Parish was in the diocese of Cashel.

Geography 

The area encompasses fertile pasture land (used almost exclusively for dairy farming). The Galtee Mountains are visible from most of the area. The townland is in the parish of Lattin/Cullen and the school's Gaelic Athletic Association and religious affiliations are concentrated in Lattin. The townland itself contains no retail shops or commercial outlets, the nearest shop being in Tipperary Town.

Notable buildings 

The local Protestant church was built about 1808, and the tower added in 1818. There was a school-house, though not in use, partly built by Caroline Damer, who also endowed it with an acre of land. Damerville Court was built in the mid 18th century by John Damer, and is marked as a "ruin" in maps since at least the 19th century. These ruins lie behind the present Shronell National School.

Folklore 

A number of local tales about Damer relate to the man who once held these lands. In one of these tales, it is said that the local Irish language Bard, Liam Dall Ó hIfearnáin (1720-1803) wrote in one of his poems, that the Damer family would not survive in the Shronel district but that the O Heifernann (Heffernan) Clan would. To this day there are Heffernan's in the surrounding area but no Damer descendant remain.

The Shronel residence was never finished. It is said locally that it was destroyed by those angry at Damer's misery at being surrounded by the poor of West Tipperary. What remained of the family fortune passed to Lady Caroline Damer, his daughter and sole heir, and later to the Earl of Portarlington. The mansion, which was a large and magnificent building, was demolished in 1776, and by the mid 19th century, little remained but the offices, which were by then in a state of dilapidation.

People
 Marshal James Clarke, born on 24 October 1841.

References

Sources

 Griffiths Valuation of Ireland – Shronell, County Tipperary
 Shronell National School
 From Tipperary to Taranaki: A Family History of the Bourke Families of South Taranaki: John Bourke of Shronell, Tipperary. 2005  
 Denis G. Marnane (1985) A History of West Tipperary from 1660 – Land and Violence
 William Nolan & Thomas G. McGrath (1985)  Tipperary History & Society
 Arthur Young (1780)  A tour in Ireland Patrick Heffernan M.D. (1940)  The Heffernans and their Times William Hayes & Art Kavanagh (2003) The Tipperary Gentry Vol.1 pp79–87''

Notes

Townlands of County Tipperary
Clanwilliam, County Tipperary